Esmailabad Shur Qaleh-ye Pain (also Romanized as Esmā‘īlābād Shūr Qal‘eh-ye Pā’īn) is a village in Chahardangeh Rural District, Chaharbagh District, Savojbolagh County, Alborz Province, Iran. At the 2006 census, its population was 263, in 66 families.

References 

Populated places in Savojbolagh County